Painted dragon may refer to:
Ctenophorus pictus, a species of agamid lizard found in the drier areas of southern and central Australia
Laudakia stellio,  a species of agamid lizard found in Greece, southwest Asia, and northeast Africa

Animal common name disambiguation pages